The Journal of Micromechanics and Microengineering is a peer-reviewed scientific journal that covers all aspects of microelectromechanical systems, devices and structures, as well as micromechanics, microengineering, and microfabrication. The editor-in-chief is Weileun Fang (National Tsing Hua University).

Abstracting and indexing 
The journal had a 2021 impact factor of 2.282 according to the Journal Citation Reports. It is indexed in Inspec, PASCAL, Current Contents/Engineering Computing and Technology, Science Citation Index, Chemical Abstracts, Mass Spectrometry Bulletin, Engineering Index/Compendex, Applied Mechanics Reviews, and VINITI Database RAS.

References

External links
 

Physics journals
IOP Publishing academic journals
Monthly journals
Publications established in 1991
English-language journals